This is a list of all named mountains on Mars.

Most mountains have a name including one of the following elements:
 Mons: a large, isolated, mountain.
 Montes, plural of mons: a mountain range.
 Tholus: a small dome-shaped mountain.
 Tholi, plural of tholus: a group of (usually not contiguous) small mountains.
 Dorsa, plural of dorsum: a long low range. Not included.

See also
 List of craters on Mars
 List of mountains on Mars by height
 List of tallest mountains in the Solar System
 Mineralogy of Mars

References

External links
 Mars features database distributed with xephem v3.3 (Warning, it uses West coordinates, and table should be in East coordinates)
 IAU, USGS: Martian system nomenclature
 IAU, USGS: Mars nomenclature: mountains (planetocentric east longitude)
 IAU, USGS: Mars nomenclature: tholus (planetocentric east longitude)
 Peter Grego, Mars and how to Observe it (List of elevations of named Martian mountains)

Mars
 
Surface features of Mars